The Museum of Tolerance Jerusalem (MTJ) is a Simon Wiesenthal Center-planned complex due to be used from 2022 onwards as a convention center, entertainment venue, and town square, with a secondary use as a museum of tolerance in Israeli society.

The three-acre, 185,000 square foot campus stands at the center of West Jerusalem between Zion Square and the neighborhood of Mamilla.  Construction started in 2004, but ran into various problems and the MTJ had to be re-designed on a more modest scale than originally planned. 

The complex will include a garden, a 1,000-seat outdoor amphitheater, a 400-seat indoor theater, two "museums of tolerance" - one each for children and adults -, further auditoriums and lecture rooms including an 800-seat lecture hall, a 500-seat banquet hall, a gender-separated religious study hall, as well as other accommodations. Museum officials admit that calling the MTJ a "museum" is to a certain degree misleading, it being intended to "revive the city's center" by hosting performances, conventions, movie screenings, food and wine festivals, children's events and art workshops.

The museum's construction site is controversially inside the precincts of the Mamilla Cemetery, a culturally significant burial place dating back to the era of the Crusades. Human remains were interred from their resting places during the construction.

Purpose

Museum proper
Two museums of tolerance, one for children and one for adults, will address tolerance in Israeli society. The museum is committed to topics like tolerance in sports and in the health and education systems, but has been criticized for its apparent reluctance - which it rejects - of dealing with local real-life problems, including the occupation, discrimination and human rights issues, a fact that has created for the as yet not inaugurated MTJ an image of a right-wing institution.

According to the Simon Wiesenthal Center, the museum has the purpose of addressing "global anti-Semitism, extremism, hate, human dignity and responsibility, and promoting unity and respect among Jews and people of all faiths."

Unlike the Museum of Tolerance of Los Angeles, the MTJ will not deal with the Holocaust, as demanded by Yad Vashem, the dedicated institution based in Jerusalem.

Complex
The MTJ is designed to "revive the city's center" by serving as a venue for theater and music performances, conventions, food and wine festivals, children's events, art workshops, and as a cinema.

Design and construction
The first design was originally designed by Frank Gehry and was to include a museum, a theater, a conference hall, a library, and an educational center. The design had been seen as unique for Israel and, as such, has been met with many opponents and proponents.

The center was subsequently designed, on a more modest scale, by Israeli architects Bracha and Michael Chyutin, who themselves stepped back from the project allegedly over a "commercial dispute". The rights to their design are owned by the Simon Wiesenthal Center, who entrusted the completion of the project to the Hong Kong-based Aedas architectural firm in cooperation with the Yigal Levy architects' office in Jerusalem.

Governor of California Arnold Schwarzenegger was invited to break ground on 30 April 2004. As of June 2022, the center is planned to open within months rather than years, with the actual two museum exhibits being the last to be completed.

Pro and con arguments

Urbanism
Those who are in favor of the Center, including former Jerusalem mayor Uri Lupolianski, maintain that it will bring tourists to the city, while its opponents (excluding the Muslim gravesite objection) argue that it will stand out and draw attention away from the traditional architecture of neighboring streets and that of the city in general. Former deputy mayor of Jerusalem Meron Benvenisti has objected to the museum's "geometric forms that can't be any more dissonant to the environment in which it is planned to put this alien object." The question has also been raised of whether the central location is suitable for conventions and "flashy events" (compare with the location of the existing International Convention Center).

Muslim cemetery controversy 

The museum's footprint intrudes into the corner of the Ma'aman Allah (Mamilla) Cemetery, which dates back to the time of the Crusades and contains the graves of Islamic figures, as well as several Mamluk tombs. It has been characterized as "the largest and most important Muslim cemetery in all of Palestine". It was used as a burial site up until 1927 when the Supreme Muslim Council decided to preserve it as a historic site. Following the 1948 Arab–Israeli War, the cemetery and other waqf properties in West Jerusalem fell under the control of Israeli governmental bodies.

Construction had been stayed several times by the courts before allowing it to continue. After controversy concerning its location on part of the land of a burial site came to head, the museum's construction was frozen by a Supreme Court order issued in February 2006. In November 2008, the Israeli Supreme Court allowed construction to proceed, noting that this corner of the cemetery had been transformed into a parking lot "as long ago as the 1960s", and that Jerusalem has been inhabited for roughly 4,000 years, and many ancient sites have been built over. The decision faced criticism from many Palestinians, Muslims around the world, and some Israeli and American Jews.

The groups who initiated the legal action which resulted in the Supreme Court order to freeze all construction had been undergoing mediation with representatives of the Simon Wiesenthal Center. Former Supreme Court president Meir Shamgar served as the mediator.

Shifting purpose 
The MTJ officials have been accused of hiding the actual purpose of the center, which will be that of a convention center and culture venue rather than a museum, the initial declared purpose for which the city had allocated the land. MTJ representatives argue that the range of purposes was clear from the beginning.

References

Citations

Sources

External links
 Simon Wiesenthal Center official site

Museums in Jerusalem
Proposed museums
Proposed buildings and structures in Israel
Museums and exhibits about antisemitism